St. Luke's Episcopal Church is an Episcopal church in Atlanta, Georgia. The parish was founded in 1864, with the current building on Peachtree Street constructed in 1906.

History 
The parish of St. Luke's was organized by Charles Todd Quintard on March 28, 1864, in the midst of the American Civil War. On April 22 of that year, Stephen Elliott, Bishop of the Episcopal Diocese of Georgia, consecrated the parish's first church building, with Quintard as its rector. This church house, bounded by Broad Street, Walton Street, and Forsyth Street in downtown Atlanta, cost $12,000 to build and held its first church service on April 24. On June 15, Quintard and Reverend John W. Beckwith hosted funeral services for Confederate major general and former Episcopal Bishop Leonidas K. Polk, who had been killed a day prior at the Battle of Kennesaw Mountain. Several days later, a funeral was held at the church for the infant son of Richard Peters. In August, shells fired by Union forces severely damaged the building, which was later destroyed during the burning of Atlanta.

The parish would be reformed on June 12, 1870 under the name St. Stephen's, in honor of Elliott. The name was reverted to St. Luke's on January 8, 1872. In 1875, a new building was erected at the intersection of Spring Street and Walton Street. On April 10, 1881, Bishop John W. Beckwith made St. Luke's his cathedral, the first building to ever be designated as such in the Episcopal Diocese of Georgia. Financial difficulties facing St. Luke's had prompted the decision to bestow cathedral status on the parish, as Beckwith felt it would help the parish. In 1883, a new cathedral was built at the intersection of Pryor Street and Houston Street, at the present-day location of the Georgia-Pacific Tower. In 1894, the parish lost cathedral status.

In 1906, the church constructed a new building on Peachtree Street, which was consecrated later that year and is currently in use by the church. This Gothic structure was designed by P. Thornton Marye and A. Ten Eyck Brown. The move came during a time when many churches in Atlanta were relocating to Peachtree Street, as First Methodist Church, St. Mark Methodist Church, and First Baptist Church had all relocated to Peachtree Street during the first decade of the 1900s. In 1931, John M. Walker was made the rector of St. Luke's, a position he would hold until being made bishop of the Episcopal Diocese of Atlanta in 1942.

Tower & Bells 
The church's bell tower is a new addition, being added in 2000, and following the original plans. 

It contains a ring of ten bells hung for change ringing, and tuned to the key of F. The heaviest eight bells date to 1924 and were cast by Mears & Stainbank of Whitechapel, London- as such they are the oldest set of bells in Georgia. 

From the date of their casting in 1924 until 1996, they were hung in St Helen's Church, Escrick, North Yorkshire. In that year, the church bought the redundant ring of twelve bells from St Martin in the Bull Ring, Birmingham, and sold their previous bells. The old ring of eight bells arrived in Atlanta in 2000, and were augmented by two trebles cast by Eijsbouts of the Netherlands specially for St. Luke's new tower to form a ring of ten. The bells and their tower were blessed on July 9, and dedicated on October 22 2000. The bells are rung regularly by the parish band of ringers.

Notes

References

Bibliography

External links 
 
 

1864 establishments in Georgia (U.S. state)
Churches completed in 1906
Churches in Atlanta
Episcopal church buildings in Georgia (U.S. state)
Religious organizations established in 1864